The Drakensberg rock gecko, Drakensberg flat gecko, or mountain flat gecko (Afroedura nivaria) is a species of African gecko found in South Africa and Lesotho.

References

Afroedura
Reptiles of Lesotho
Reptiles of South Africa
Taxa named by George Albert Boulenger
Reptiles described in 1894